Kota Pagatan (other names: Pagattan/Pegattan) is a town located in the regency of Kusan Hilir, Tanah Bumbu, Tanah Bumbu, Kalimantan Selatan province, Indonesia.

Landmarks

Pantai Pagatan 
Pagatan has an exotic beach, so-called Pagatan Beach. Not only people from this region, but also from Banjarmasin (the capital city of Kalimantan Selatan) visit this place for refreshing and recreation. This place also becomes the place for any cultural event, especially the annual event Maccera tasi (Buginese language: Party of the Sea).

Culture

Kain Tenun Pagatan

Mappanretasi 
Mappanretasi is the term used by local people that means to feed the sea. This symbolic terms is intended to appreciate Allah, the God they worship, for the blessing that He has given through the sea and for the safety when they go to the sea for a living. Since they are mostly fishermen, they feel the event as their part of life.

Mappanretasi is held annually in November.*1 The form of the event is by providing some local food and throwing them to the sea (simply like "feeding" the sea). The leader then deliver some prayers during the activities.

References

External links 
 Data desa di BPS Tanah Bumbu

Populated places in South Kalimantan